Orhanlı is a belde (town) in the central district (Niğde) of Niğde Province, Turkey. The population of Orhanlı is 3125  as of 2011. Like most other settlements in ancient Capadocia,  the caves around the town were used as dwellings in the deep history of the town and in fact, the name of the town is probably a corrupt form of the phrase On hanlı ("with ten dwellings") referring to ten families settled in the caves.

References

Populated places in Niğde Province
Towns in Turkey
Niğde Central District